João Paulo Soares Almeida (born 10 January 1993) is a Portuguese footballer who plays for Ovarense as a midfielder.

External links
 
Stats and profile at LPFP

1993 births
Living people
Portuguese footballers
Association football midfielders
Liga Portugal 2 players
U.D. Oliveirense players
C.D. Estarreja players
A.D. Ovarense players
Sportspeople from Aveiro District